WSIX can refer to:

WSIX-FM, a radio station (97.9 FM) licensed to serve Nashville, Tennessee. 
WKRN-TV, an ABC-affiliated television station licensed to serve Nashville, Tennessee, which used the WSIX-TV callsign until 1973.